Paul Carlyle "Curly" Armstrong (November 1, 1918 – June 6, 1983) was an American professional basketball player and coach.

A 5'11" guard/forward, Armstrong starred at Central High School in Fort Wayne, Indiana, where he reached two state championship games while leading his team to a 50–6 record. In the late 1930s and early 1940s, Armstrong attended Indiana University, earning All-Big Ten Conference honors during his junior year. He then played, and briefly coached, for the Fort Wayne Zollner Pistons professional basketball team (today's Detroit Pistons). In 1943, he was named the World Professional Basketball Tournament's Most Valuable Player. He was inducted into the Indiana Basketball Hall of Fame in 1980.

He was head basketball coach at Wabash College in Crawfordsville, Indiana, for two seasons.  His record in 1951–52 was 10 wins and 10 losses.  His record in 1952–53 was 9 wins and 10 losses.

BAA/NBA career statistics

Regular season

Playoffs

References

External links
 

1918 births
1983 deaths
American men's basketball players
Basketball coaches from Indiana
Basketball players from Fort Wayne, Indiana
Guards (basketball)
Indiana Hoosiers men's basketball players
Fort Wayne Pistons head coaches
Fort Wayne Pistons players
Fort Wayne Zollner Pistons coaches
Fort Wayne Zollner Pistons players
Player-coaches
Sportspeople from Fort Wayne, Indiana
Wabash Little Giants basketball coaches